A dwarf galaxy is a small galaxy composed of about 1000 up to several billion stars, as compared to the Milky Way's 200–400 billion stars. The Large Magellanic Cloud, which closely orbits the Milky Way and contains over 30 billion stars, is sometimes classified as a dwarf galaxy; others consider it a full-fledged galaxy. Dwarf galaxies' formation and activity are thought to be heavily influenced by interactions with larger galaxies. Astronomers identify numerous types of dwarf galaxies, based on their shape and composition.

Formation 

One theory states that most galaxies, including dwarf galaxies, form in association with dark matter, or from gas that contains metals. However, NASA's Galaxy Evolution Explorer space probe identified new dwarf galaxies forming out of gases  with low metallicity. These galaxies were located in the Leo Ring, a cloud of hydrogen and helium around two massive galaxies in the constellation Leo.

Because of their small size, dwarf galaxies have been observed being pulled toward and ripped by neighbouring spiral galaxies, resulting in stellar streams and eventually galaxy merger.

Local dwarf galaxies

There are many dwarf galaxies in the Local Group; these small galaxies frequently orbit larger galaxies, such as the Milky Way, the Andromeda Galaxy and the Triangulum Galaxy. A 2007 paper has suggested that many dwarf galaxies were created by galactic tides during the early evolutions of the Milky Way and Andromeda. Tidal dwarf galaxies are produced when galaxies collide and their gravitational masses interact. Streams of galactic material are pulled away from the parent galaxies and the halos of dark matter that surround them. A 2018 study suggests that some local dwarf galaxies formed extremely early, during the Dark Ages within the first billion years after the Big Bang.

More than 20 known dwarf galaxies orbit the Milky Way, and recent observations have also led astronomers to believe the largest globular cluster in the Milky Way, Omega Centauri, is in fact the core of a dwarf galaxy with a black hole at its centre, which was at some time absorbed by the Milky Way.

Common types

 Elliptical galaxy: dwarf elliptical galaxy (dE) 
 Dwarf spheroidal galaxy (dSph): Once a subtype of dwarf ellipticals, now regarded as a distinct type 
 Irregular galaxy: dwarf irregular galaxy (dIrr)
 Spiral galaxy: dwarf spiral galaxy (dS) 
 Magellanic type dwarfs
 Blue compact dwarf galaxies (see section below)
 Ultra-compact dwarf galaxies (see section below)

Blue compact dwarf galaxies

In astronomy, a blue compact dwarf galaxy (BCD galaxy) is a small galaxy which contains large clusters of young, hot, massive stars. These stars, the brightest of which are blue, cause the galaxy itself to appear blue in colour. Most BCD galaxies are also classified as dwarf irregular galaxies or as dwarf lenticular galaxies. Because they are composed of star clusters, BCD galaxies lack a uniform shape. They consume gas intensely, which causes their stars to become very violent when forming.

BCD galaxies cool in the process of forming new stars. The galaxies' stars are all formed at different time periods, so the galaxies have time to cool and to build up matter to form new stars. As time passes, this star formation changes the shape of the galaxies.

Nearby examples include NGC 1705, NGC 2915, NGC 3353 and UGCA 281.

Ultra-faint dwarf galaxies

Ultra-faint dwarf galaxies (UFDs) are a class of galaxies that contain from a few hundred to one hundred thousand stars, making them the faintest galaxies in the Universe. UFDs resemble globular clusters (GCs) in appearance but have very different properties. Unlike GCs, UFDs contain a significant amount of dark matter and are more extended.  UFDs were first discovered with the advent of digital sky surveys in 2005, in particular with the Sloan Digital Sky Survey (SDSS).

UFDs are the most dark matter-dominated systems known. Astronomers believe that UFDs encode valuable information about the early Universe, as all UFDs discovered so far are ancient systems that have likely formed very early on, only a few million years after the Big Bang and before the epoch of reionization. Recent theoretical work has hypothesised the existence of a population of young UFDs that form at a much later time than the ancient UFDs.  These galaxies have not been observed in our Universe so far.

Ultra-compact dwarfs
Ultra-compact dwarf galaxies (UCD) are a class of very compact galaxies with very high stellar densities,
discovered in the 2000s.
They are thought to be on the order of 200 light years across, containing about 100 million stars. It is theorised that these are the cores of nucleated dwarf elliptical galaxies that have been stripped of gas and outlying stars by tidal interactions, travelling through the hearts of rich clusters. UCDs have been found in the Virgo Cluster, Fornax Cluster, Abell 1689, and the Coma Cluster, amongst others.
In particular, an unprecedentedly large sample of ~ 100 UCDs has been found in the core region of the Virgo cluster by the Next Generation Virgo Cluster Survey team. The first ever relatively robust studies of the global properties of Virgo UCDs suggest that
UCDs have distinct dynamical
and structural properties from normal globular clusters. An extreme  example of UCD is M60-UCD1, about 54 million light years away, which contains approximately 200 million solar masses within a 160 light year radius; its central region packs in stars about 25 times closer together than stars in Earth's region in the Milky Way.
M59-UCD3 is approximately the same size as M60-UCD1 with a half-light radius, rh, of approximately 20 parsecs but is 40% more luminous with an absolute visual magnitude of approximately −14.6.  This makes M59-UCD3 the densest known galaxy.
Based on stellar orbital velocities, two UCD in the Virgo Cluster are claimed to have supermassive black holes weighing 13% and 18% of the galaxies' masses.

Partial list 

Aquarius Dwarf
Canis Major Dwarf Galaxy
Crater 2 dwarf
Eridanus II
Henize 2-10
I Zwicky 18
IC 10
Large Magellanic Cloud
NGC 1569
NGC 1705
NGC 2915

Pegasus Dwarf Irregular Galaxy
PHL 293B
Phoenix Dwarf
Sagittarius Dwarf Spheroidal Galaxy
Sagittarius Dwarf Irregular Galaxy
Sculptor Dwarf Galaxy
Sculptor Dwarf Irregular Galaxy
Sextans A
Sextans Dwarf Spheroidal
Small Magellanic Cloud
Tucana Dwarf
Ursa Major I Dwarf
Ursa Major II Dwarf
Ursa Minor Dwarf
Willman 1
Carina Dwarf
Draco Dwarf
Fornax Dwarf
Leo I
Leo II

Gallery

Galaxy

See also

References

External links

Milky Way Satellite Galaxies 
SPACE.com article on "hobbit galaxies"
Science article on "hobbit galaxies" 

Galaxy morphological types